The Manhattan New York Temple is the 119th operating temple of the Church of Jesus Christ of Latter-day Saints (LDS Church).  It is the second "high rise" LDS temple to be constructed, after the Hong Kong China Temple, and the third LDS temple converted from an existing building, the previous two being the Vernal Utah Temple and the Copenhagen Denmark Temple.

Historical background

The announcement of a temple in New York City was made on August 7, 2002.  News coverage was widespread.  Several months before, on March 24, 2002, at a special regional conference broadcast from Manhattan to surrounding stakes and districts, LDS Church president Gordon B. Hinckley told those in attendance that he expected a temple to be built in the area in the next two years.  It was widely assumed that this was in reference to the previously announced temple in Harrison, New York, construction of which had been delayed for several years.  The need for a temple in the area became apparent during the previous decade when local church membership tripled to more than 42,000 members.

Groundbreaking and construction

A groundbreaking ceremony and site dedication were held on September 23, 2002, with construction beginning soon after. Temple architect was Frank Fernandez, who has worked on other large Church building projects in Manhattan, as supervised by Temple Department construction manager Cory Karl. As was done with the Vernal Utah Temple, the church decided to adapt an existing stake center building—which stands on the northeast corner of the intersection of West 65th Street, Broadway, and Columbus Avenue, and is across the street from Lincoln Center—into the temple. The original building was dedicated in May 1975 by church president Spencer W. Kimball and still houses a church public affairs office on the second floor and a chapel, cultural hall, baptismal font, and classrooms on the third floor.

The temple currently occupies part of the first floor and all of the fourth, fifth, and sixth floors of the building. (Originally, prior to renovations announced in 2006, it occupied part of the first and second floors and all of the fifth and sixth floors, but none of the fourth floor, which floor had housed offices of the New York New York Stake since 1975.) The insides of these floors were completely renovated. Previously, the fifth and sixth floors constituted a second chapel and set of classrooms that were dedicated in 2002, which in turn were adapted from an early gym and sports club built as part of the neighboring apartment complex. The walls of the temple were designed to be soundproof so that the noise of the traffic outside would not interrupt temple patrons. Uncommon to some temples with two progressive ordinance rooms, the second ordinance room of the Manhattan temple is perpendicular to the first (due to the building's size limitations). The building's elevator system is unique, in that it is designed to service generally public floors for Sunday worship services and temple-only areas when the temple is in operation on other days of the week.

Open house and dedication

The local temple committee, under the direction of general authority Glenn L. Pace, and later David R. Stone, was headed by Brent J. Belnap, president of the church's New York New York Stake and assisted by W. Blair Garff (later called as temple president), Stephen D. Quinn, and others.  From May 8 through June 5, 2004, more than 53,000 people toured the temple during the public open house.  LDS members and non-members alike viewed a 15-minute introductory video and took a 40-minute walking tour through the first, fifth, and sixth floors of the temple.  Many others experienced the LDS temple through worldwide media coverage. Local LDS members who were called to help, assisted by Mormon missionaries, gave the tours.  Special guests during the open house included two members of the United States Senate and other national and local dignitaries.

On June 12, 2004, a cultural "jubilee celebration" was held at Radio City Music Hall, entitled "A Standard for the Nations." It was a two-hour performance including more than 2,400 LDS youth from the area (the largest cast to ever perform on the stage of Radio City Music Hall).  In attendance were LDS Church president Gordon B. Hinckley and Robert D. Hales of the church's Quorum of the Twelve Apostles.  Master of ceremonies for the jubilee, which was broadcast to surrounding stake centers and was immediately followed by a youth fireside, was Dave Checketts.

Hinckley officially dedicated the Manhattan New York Temple in four dedicatory sessions on Sunday, June 13, 2004. As part of the first dedicatory session, a special cornerstone laying ceremony was held, during which a time capsule containing memorabilia from New York, such as a copy of The New York Times and other church-related items, including a set of scriptures, a handkerchief used during the dedication ceremony, and sheet music, were placed within the cornerstone.

Architecture and design elements

The temple incorporates a variety of symbolic elements that evoke basic doctrinal beliefs of the LDS Church concerning Jesus Christ and his teachings as understood by Latter-day Saints, as well as symbols important within the local community.  Manhattan temple design motifs include "living waters," beehives, olives and olive trees, grapevines, starbursts, and the Statue of Liberty.  Even the furniture upholstery tacks incorporate specific symbolic elements (e.g., crowns, stars, beehives, etc.).  Carved into the medium-stain oak wood panels and molding are beehives, while door handle escutcheon plates incorporate the Statue of Liberty torch together with fig or grape leaves and stars.  Curved archways above ordinance room doors and mirrors contain design elements specifically adapted from the Salt Lake Temple.

On the main (first or ground-level) floor of the temple, directly in front of two interior bronze front doors that incorporate abstract starbursts, is a large art glass mural depicting the resurrected Christ speaking with two of his disciples on the road to Emmaus. Also on the main floor is the baptistry, where vicarious baptisms are performed.  Above the baptismal font is a large mural showing the waters of the Jordan River flowing down toward the font.

The fifth floor of the temple contains patron changing areas, a small chapel (which initially served as temple office space), and endowment ordinance rooms.  The first endowment ordinance room (representing the traditional temple Creation Room, Garden Room, and World Room (or Telestial Kingdom)) incorporates wall-to-ceiling murals depicting the natural landscape and fauna common to the Hudson River Valley.  The second endowment ordinance room (representing the Terrestrial Kingdom) extends approximately one and one-half floors high and contains two unadorned faux art glass windows and Ionic columns gilded with white gold leaf highlights.  Above the veil is a long horizontal art glass window with olive fruit and branches.  The Celestial Room is perfectly square.  Flanking its walls are 8 Corinthian columns (four half-columns and 4 quarter-columns), the capitals of which are lightly gilded with yellow and white gold leaf, plus 4 mirrors and two faux art glass windows with olive fruit and olive leaves surrounded by grapes and grape leaves.  The height of the Celestial Room extends two stories and incorporates an upper-level balcony (which is non-accessible to patrons) that maximizes a sense of open vertical space.  Above the balcony arches and art glass windows, on each of the room's walls, are four round abstract starburst windows.

The sixth floor of the temple has a long hallway and an open stairwell that lead to two sealing rooms, each of which contains two faux art glass windows similar to (but not exactly the same as) those found in the Celestial Room.  The walls of the Celestial Room and the two sealing rooms are finished in cream Venetian plaster.

All interior art glass windows were created by Utah-based artist Tom Holdman.  All are backlit in order to preserve a quiet atmosphere devoid of city traffic distractions.  Along hallway walls are original works of art by noted landscape artists depicting scenes from nature as well as other artwork prints commonly found in other LDS temples and meetinghouses.  Both the first endowment ordinance room and baptismal font murals were painted by Linda Curley Christensen.

The temple exterior retains much of the original travertine stone facade.  Also on the temple exterior are large art glass panels depicting flowing water.

Steeple completion and later modifications

Just before the temple dedication it was announced that a statue of the angel Moroni would be added to the almost-completed steeple in the fall of 2004. On October 9, 2004, several thousand people came to watch the ten-foot gold-leafed statue be placed on top of the steeple. Unlike the angel Moroni atop most LDS temples that face eastward, the angel Moroni on this temple points southwest, since the pre-existing building faced that direction.

In a local church conference on November 12, 2006, it was officially announced that the fourth floor, which at the time housed classrooms and stake offices associated with the third-floor chapel, would be converted to become part of the temple and that the stake center for the New York New York Stake would be moved to a new location on East 87th Street.  This work was completed in August 2007.  The temple baptistry continues to occupy part of the first floor of the building, and the rest of the temple occupies all of the fourth, fifth, and sixth floors.  The third floor remains a chapel for local congregations, and the second floor continues to house a public affairs office as well as a small distribution center and multiple-use room.

During later renovations to the third floor meetinghouse space, the chapel windows, which had previously allowed in natural light but were sealed off during temple construction, were opened up again to allow in natural light through the art glass windows.

In 2010 the exterior of the temple was modified to add stone-clad support columns along the Columbus Avenue-side arcade.  In early 2011, the sidewalk space between the support columns and the temple proper was upgraded to incorporate a series of stylized granite beehive medallions matching in appearance those found elsewhere within the temple.

Pipe organ

The church commissioned organbuilder Sebastian M. Glück to design and build a new pipe organ for the New York Stake Center chapel in 2004. Tabernacle Organist Clay Christiansen collaborated in the design. This was Mr. Glück's first instrument built with slider-and-pallet windchests, a departure from his usual electro-pneumatic Pitman actions. The starkly modern instrument stands front and center in the chapel.

In the news

Coverage of the Manhattan Temple open house was exceptional in comparison with most other recently completed temples.  The temple was featured in most national newspapers, including The New York Times, The Washington Post, the Los Angeles Times, The Wall Street Journal, and USA Today, and in newspapers in Europe and Asia.  It was also featured on CNN.

An anti-Mormon protest attended by many thousands of gay rights activists converged outside the temple on November 12, 2008, to protest the LDS Church's position in support of California's Proposition 8.  No vandalism against the temple was reported.

In 2020, the Manhattan New York Temple was closed in response to the coronavirus pandemic.

See also

 Steven D. Bennion, temple president (2013–)
 Comparison of temples of The Church of Jesus Christ of Latter-day Saints
 List of temples of The Church of Jesus Christ of Latter-day Saints
 List of temples of The Church of Jesus Christ of Latter-day Saints by geographic region
 Temple (Latter Day Saints)
 Temple architecture (Latter-day Saints)

References

External links

 Official site
 Manhattan New York Temple at ChurchofJesusChristTemples.org
 Manhattan Mormon Temple at NYC.com
 Mormon Temple at NewYorkArchitecture.Info

21st-century Latter Day Saint temples
Latter Day Saint movement in New York (state)
Religious buildings and structures in Manhattan
Religious buildings and structures completed in 2004
Temples (LDS Church) in the United States
Lincoln Square, Manhattan
2004 establishments in New York City